Sudeoksan is a mountain of South Korea. It has an elevation of 794 metres

See also
List of mountains of Korea

References

Mountains of Gyeonggi Province
Gapyeong County
Mountains of South Korea